The Encino Hospital Medical Center is a hospital in Encino, California.

The hospital's ownership changed in June 2008 when Tenet Healthcare sold it to the current owner, Prime Healthcare Services.  Previously, the hospital was one of the campuses of the Encino-Tarzana Regional Medical Center.

See also

References

External links
Encino Hospital Medical Center official website

Hospitals in the San Fernando Valley
Encino, Los Angeles
Healthcare in Los Angeles
Hospitals in Los Angeles
Prime Healthcare Services
2008 establishments in California